The 1971 Milwaukee Brewers season involved the Brewers' finishing sixth in the American League West with a record of 69 wins and 92 losses.

Offseason 
October 1, 1970: Sixto Lezcano was signed by the Milwaukee Brewers as an amateur free agent. 
 October 20, 1970: Jerry McNertney, George Lauzerique, and Jesse Huggins (minors) were traded by the Brewers to the St. Louis Cardinals for Carl Taylor and Jim Ellis.
 October 20, 1970: Larry Bearnarth was purchased by the Brewers from the New York Mets.
 December 2, 1970: Hank Allen, John Ryan (minors) and Paul Click (minors) were traded by the Brewers to the Atlanta Braves for Bob Tillman.
 February 2, 1971: Carl Taylor was traded by the Brewers to the Kansas City Royals for Ellie Rodríguez.
 February 10, 1971: Al Downing was traded by the Brewers to the Los Angeles Dodgers for Andy Kosco.
March 6, 1971: Oakland Athletics owner Charlie Finley persuaded American League president Joe Cronin to have a preseason game in which a walk was allowed on three pitches rather than four. The Athletics bested the Milwaukee Brewers by a 13–9 tally. Nineteen total walks were issued in the game, and a collective six home runs were hit.

Regular season

Season standings

Record vs. opponents

Notable transactions 
 April 22, 1971: Ray Peters and Pete Koegel were traded by the Brewers to the Philadelphia Phillies for Johnny Briggs.
 May 11, 1971: Ted Savage was traded by the Brewers to the Kansas City Royals for Tom Matchick.
 June 1, 1971: Floyd Wicker was traded by the Brewers to the San Francisco Giants for Bob Heise.
 June 7, 1971: Danny Walton was traded by the Brewers to the New York Yankees for Frank Tepedino and Bobby Mitchell.
 June 8, 1971: 1971 Major League Baseball draft
Rob Ellis was drafted by the Brewers in the 1st round.
Kevin Kobel was drafted by the Brewers in the 10th round.
 July 8, 1971: Phil Roof was traded by the Brewers to the Minnesota Twins for Paul Ratliff.

Roster

Player stats

Batting

Starters by position 
Note: Pos = Position; G = Games played; AB = At bats; H = Hits; Avg. = Batting average; HR = Home runs; RBI = Runs batted in

Other batters 
Note: G = Games played; AB = At bats; H = Hits; Avg. = Batting average; HR = Home runs; RBI = Runs batted in

Pitching

Starting pitchers 
Note: G = Games pitched; IP = Innings pitched; W = Wins; L = Losses; ERA = Earned run average; SO = Strikeouts

Other pitchers 
Note: G = Games pitched; IP = Innings pitched; W = Wins; L = Losses; ERA = Earned run average; SO = Strikeouts

Relief pitchers 
Note: G = Games pitched; W = Wins; L = Losses; SV = Saves; ERA = Earned run average; SO = Strikeouts

Farm system

The Brewers' farm system consisted of three minor league affiliates in 1971.

Notes

References 
1971 Milwaukee Brewers at Baseball Reference
1971 Milwaukee Brewers at Baseball Almanac

Milwaukee Brewers seasons
Milwaukee Brewers season